Toney Atmorer Mack (born May 3, 1967) is an American former professional basketball player.

A forward from Brandon, Florida, Mack was hailed as a young Dominique Wilkins. A prolific scorer at Brandon High School,  In 1985, Mack was named Florida's Mr. Basketball.   Mack attended the University of Georgia but was unable to finish due to academic issues. Despite his failure to finish his collegiate career at Georgia,  Mack was picked in the second round by the Philadelphia 76ers in 1989. He played for the Topeka Sizzlers in the Continental League. In 2011, the Orlando Sentinel named him one of the top nine high school basketball players in Florida History.

References

External links
 Toney Mack Player Profile
 Spotlight on Mack
 Philadelphia 76ers Draft Picks
 Brandon's Mack is a shooting star

1967 births
Living people
American expatriate basketball people in Venezuela
American men's basketball players
Basketball players from Florida
Centers (basketball)
Georgia Bulldogs basketball players
Parade High School All-Americans (boys' basketball)
Philadelphia 76ers draft picks
Power forwards (basketball)
People from Brandon, Florida
Sportspeople from Hillsborough County, Florida
Topeka Sizzlers players
American expatriate basketball people in the Philippines
Barangay Ginebra San Miguel players
Philippine Basketball Association imports